Pyrgulopsis californiensis, the Laguna Mountain springsnail, is a species of minute freshwater snails with an operculum, aquatic gastropod molluscs or micromolluscs in the family Hydrobiidae.

This species' natural habitat is streams.  It is endemic to Campo Creek, San Diego County, California, United States.

Description
Its differentiated from other Pyrgulopsis in that its penial filament has an elongate lobe and elongate filament with the penial ornament consisting of an elongate penial gland; large, curved, transverse terminal gland; and several ventral glands.

References

Molluscs of the United States
californiensis
Gastropods described in 1965
Endemic fauna of California
Fauna without expected TNC conservation status